Lars Dietz (born 7 January 1997) is a German professional footballer who plays as a midfielder for 3. Liga club Viktoria Köln.

Club career
Dietz began his career in Rot Weiss Ahlen's youth system, before joining Borussia Dortmund in 2009. Despite never making a first team appearance for Borussia Dortmund, Dietz played 38 league games for the club's reserve team in the Regionalliga over the course of three seasons.

On 3 January 2018, Union Berlin confirmed the signing of Dietz on a contract running until the summer of 2021. On 31 August 2018, Dietz joined 3. Liga club Sportfreunde Lotte on loan for the rest of the 2018–19 season.

On 13 August 2019, Dietz joined Viktoria Köln on loan until the end of 2019–20 season.

International career
Dietz made 7 appearances for Germany U20, making his debut in a 1–0 loss against Italy U20 as a substitute on 1 September 2016.

References

External links
 
 Profile at kicker.de
 

1997 births
Living people
People from Soest (district)
Sportspeople from Arnsberg (region)
German footballers
Germany youth international footballers
Association football midfielders
Borussia Dortmund II players
1. FC Union Berlin players
Sportfreunde Lotte players
FC Viktoria Köln players
Würzburger Kickers players
3. Liga players
Regionalliga players
Footballers from North Rhine-Westphalia